The discography of Rocket from the Crypt, a San Diego-based alternative rock band active from 1990 to 2005, consists of seven studio albums, two EPs, one live album, two DVDs, twenty-eight singles, and eight music videos.

Rocket from the Crypt was formed in 1990 with an initial lineup of singer/guitarist John Reis (Speedo), guitarist Andy Stamets (ND), bassist Pete Reichert (Petey X), drummer Sean, and backing vocalist Elaina. Their debut album, Paint as a Fragrance, was released in 1991 through the Cargo Music imprint Headhunter Records. Sean and Elaina then moved away from San Diego and drummer Adam Willard (Atom) and saxophonist Paul O'Beirne (Apollo 9) joined. The band released a series of vinyl singles on various independent record labels, followed by their second album, Circa: Now!, on Headhunter in 1992. Trumpeter Jason Crane (JC 2000) joined the band just as Circa: Now! attracted the attention of major record labels. Rocket from the Crypt signed with Interscope Records, who re-released Circa: Now! while Cargo released All Systems Go, a compilation album of the band's vinyl singles.

The band's contract with Interscope included the freedom to record vinyl releases for other labels. They had three releases in 1995: The EP The State of Art is on Fire, the LP Hot Charity, and the album Scream, Dracula, Scream! The singles "Born in '69" and "Young Livers" reached the UK Singles Chart at #68 and #67 respectively. "On a Rope" was a greater success, reaching #12. Music videos for all three singles were played on MTV and MTV Europe, and Scream, Dracula, Scream! peaked at #41 on the UK Albums Chart. RFTC was released in 1998 but did not fare as well as its predecessor, reaching only #63 while its lead single "Lipstick" reached #64. Rocket from the Crypt left Interscope in 1999 and released the EP Cut Carefully and Play Loud independently. Disagreements over the band's direction led to Willard leaving the group, and the band took a hiatus during which Reis founded Swami Records and released All Systems Go 2.

Rocket from the Crypt next signed to Vagrant Records and released Group Sounds in 2001, including contributions from Superchunk drummer Jon Wurster as well as their new permanent drummer Mario Rubalcaba (Ruby Mars). Group Sounds was their first album to chart in their home country, reaching #40 on Billboard's Top Independent Albums chart. Live from Camp X-Ray followed in 2002 and reached #45. It proved to be their final studio album, as the members drifted into other projects over the next few years and decided to disband. Rocket from the Crypt's final performance on Halloween 2005 in San Diego was filmed and recorded, and was released in 2008 as R.I.P. All Systems Go 3 followed that same year, and Reis plans to eventually release a fourth, final installment in the series.  In October 2011 the band reunited for the children's television Yo Gabba Gabba! where they would perform a brand new song titled "He's a Chef" which was released as a limited edition single exclusively through Volcom clothing stores and later on the 2017 compilation Yo Gabba Gabba! Hey!. A reunion tour followed in 2012. In March 2015 Vintage Piss was released under Sonny Vincent and Rocket from the Crypt. Rocket from the Crypt, minus the horn section, served as Vincent's backing band. The album was originally recorded in 2003 but left unmixed and unfinished until Reis, who also produced the album, decided to go back and give the album a proper mixing and release

Studio albums 

I Circa: Now! was reissued on CD by Interscope in 1993, and again in 2004 by Swami as Circa: Now! +4.

II Hot Charity was reissued on CD by Swami in 2002 on the compilation album Hot Charity / Cut Carefully and Play Loud.

III Despite its title, Live from Camp X-Ray is a studio album rather than a live album.

Live album 

I R.I.P. is a CD/DVD combination package.

Compilation albums 

I All Systems Go was initially released only in Japan. A second version with a different track list was released in the United States by Cargo Music later the same year. This version was re-released by Sympathy for the Record Industry in 1998.

II Hot Charity / Cut Carefully and Play Loud combines the LP Hot Charity and the EP Cut Carefully and Play Loud.

Extended plays 

I The State of Art Is on Fire was reissued on CD in 1996, including the tracks from Rocket from the Crypt Plays the Music Machine.

II Cut Carefully and Play Loud was reissued on CD by Swami in 2002 on the compilation album Hot Charity / Cut Carefully and Play Loud.

Singles
Rocket from the Crypt released 28 singles on both vinyl and CD formats during their career, but only 6 of these were commercially released singles intended to promote specific songs from their albums. The remaining 22 were vinyl-only singles and are listed below under "Vinyl singles". Promotional singles of "Ditch Digger" and "Sturdy Wrists" from Circa: Now! were released to radio stations for airplay, but these were not released as commercial singles.

Vinyl singles 
Rocket from the Crypt released 22 singles during their career that were exclusive to the vinyl format. Most of these were released in limited numbers and were not distributed to radio stations for airplay, unlike the 6 singles which were released to promote specific songs from their studio albums. Many of the tracks from the vinyl singles were re-released on the All Systems Go compilation albums, as noted below.

I Denotes songs that were re-released on the US version of All Systems Go.

II Denotes songs that were re-released on All Systems Go 2.

Video albums 

I RFTC 10/31/05 is a "rough cut" version of R.I.P. released in limited quantities.

II R.I.P. is a CD/DVD combination package.

Music videos

Other appearances 
The following Rocket from the Crypt songs were released on compilation albums, soundtracks, and other releases. Some songs were later re-released on the All Systems Go compilation albums, as noted below. This is not an exhaustive list: songs that were first released on the band's albums, EPs, or singles are not included.

I Denotes songs that were re-released on All Systems Go 2.

II Denotes songs that were re-released on All Systems Go 3.

III "Flight of the Hobo" was also released on Circa: Now! +4 later the same year.

IV Originally recorded in 2003 but never mixed or finished. The band, minus the horn section, serves as Vincent's backing band. Reis went back and mixed and completed the album in 2015.

References

General references

Notes

External links 
 
 

Discography
Rock music group discographies
Discographies of American artists